Tyler Sloan (born March 15, 1981) is a Canadian former professional ice hockey defenceman. An undrafted player, Sloan spent seven years in the minor leagues before making his National Hockey League debut for the Washington Capitals in his hometown of Calgary against the Flames.

Playing career
Sloan played junior hockey for the Calgary Royals of the Alberta Junior Hockey League and Kamloops Blazers of the Western Hockey League.  Though undrafted, he was signed by the Columbus Blue Jackets and assigned to the Syracuse Crunch of the American Hockey League at the end of the 2001–02 season. Sloan spent the next seven seasons bouncing around the minors, playing for the Dayton Bombers and Las Vegas Wranglers of the ECHL, as well as the AHL's Manitoba Moose and Hershey Bears. In 2006, Sloan and the Bears won the Calder Cup championship.

Sloan was recalled by the Washington Capitals early in the 2008–09 season, where he made his National Hockey League debut for the Capitals in his hometown of Calgary against the Flames on October 21, 2008. Sloan made an immediate impact for the Capitals, levelling Calgary's Daymond Langkow with a large bodycheck, and earning the Capitals a nine-minute powerplay in the aftermath. He scored his first NHL goal on October 25 against Marty Turco of the Dallas Stars.

Sloan was sent down to Hershey on January 11, 2009, as several injured Capitals returned to action. He was recalled on May 3, 2009, during the Capitals' playoff series with Pittsburgh along with Karl Alzner and recorded an assist in Game 2 of the series the following night.

On June 27, 2011, the Capitals placed him on waivers, with the possible intention of buying out his contract. A month later on July 28, Sloan was signed as a free agent by the Nashville Predators on a one-year deal.

On July 6, 2012, Sloan signed a one-year, two-way contract with the Dallas Stars. The deal is worth $600,000 when Sloan plays for the Stars, and $105,000 when he plays for the Stars’ AHL affiliate, the Texas Stars.

Personal life
Sloan's sister, Tara, was a five-time Canadian national swimming champion and Canadian record holder who was set to compete at the swimming trials for the 2000 Summer Olympics when she was killed in a roll-over accident near Medicine Hat, Alberta in March 2000.  Tyler used the dedication his sister showed in attempting to win a spot on the Canadian Olympic team as inspiration in his own hockey career. His sister's journal of her attempts to qualify for the Olympics motivated Tyler: "Swimmers are tremendous athletes. Their work ethic is unparalleled. I saw what it took for her to get there. That was important because I didn't realize what it took to get to this level," he told The Globe and Mail newspaper.

Career statistics

References

External links

1981 births
Living people
Calgary Royals players
Canadian ice hockey defencemen
Dayton Bombers players
Hershey Bears players
Kamloops Blazers players
Las Vegas Wranglers players
Manitoba Moose players
Milwaukee Admirals players
Ice hockey people from Calgary
Syracuse Crunch players
Texas Stars players
Undrafted National Hockey League players
Washington Capitals players